The Federal Ministry of Labour and Employment is the Nigerian Federal Ministry concerned with relations between workers and employers. It is headed by the Minister of Labour and Employment, who is appointed by the President, and is assisted by a Permanent Secretary, who is a career civil servant.

The Current Minister is Dr. Chris Ngige as Minister of Labour and Employment and Festus Keyamo as the Minister of State for Labour and Employment.

Hassan Muhammed Lawal was appointed Minister of Labour in 2003, and was reappointed by President Umaru Yar'Adua in July 2007.
He was moved to the Ministry of Works and Housing and replaced by Adetokunbo Kayode in December 2008. Kayode had previously been Minister for Tourism, Culture and National Orientation.
Chief Emeka Wogu was then appointed Minister of Labour and Productivity in 2010.
The Permanent Secretary in December 2009 was Dr. Haruna Usman Sanusi.

History
The Federal Ministry of Labour and Productivity has been in existence (with different names) since 1939, with the central purpose of  ensuring cordial relations between workers and employers in the public and private sectors.
The body was created after the start of World War II to coordinate resources for war efforts, with first one and then two Labour Inspectors attached to the Governor's Office. With growing worker agitation over cost Of living allowances, the Department of Labour was established on 1 October 1942. It was headed by a Commissioner and two Labour Officers, and was charged with dealing with labour movement issues, ensuring the orderly development of Industrial Relations and enforcing protective legislations. 
The organization grew as the war progressed, with offices opened in the industrial centers of Enugu, Kaduna and Lagos. 
Later a Ministry of Labour was created in addition to the Department of Labour, and the two were merged on 1 April 1958. After  Independence in 1960, the Ministry has grown steadily, renamed the Federal Ministry of Employment Labour and Productivity in 1979 and the Ministry of Labour in January 2007.

Organization

The outward-facing divisions the Ministry of Labour are Trade Union Services and Industrial Relations; Employment and Wages and Inspectorate. The Trade Union Services Division formulates policies on trade union organizations and manages disputes and complaints. It also assists in worker's education, and keeps records on trade unions and their activities. Internally oriented departments are Human Resources; Finance and Supplies; Policy, Analysis, Research & Statistics.

The Ministry is responsible for several parastatals (government-owned agencies): Michael Imoudu National Institute For Labour Studies (MINILS), Nigerian Social Insurance Trust Fund (NSITF), National Directorate of Employment (NDE), National Productivity Center (NPC), National Industrial Court and Industrial Arbitration Panel (IAP).

Michael Imoudu National Institute for Labour Studies 

Michael Imoudu National Institute for Labour Studies (MINILS) is a government-owned labour institute established in 1986 in Ilorin, Nigeria. It is one of the statutory bodies managed by the Federal Ministry of Labour.

Named after popular labour leader, Michael Imoudu, who started his labour activities as a member of the Railway Workers Union during the colonial era, MINILS is an arm of the Federal Ministry of Labour.

MINILS is headed by the Director-General, Comrade Issa Aremu mni.

Asides regular courses, the institute also collaborates with stakeholders to train staff at various quarters on labour relations.

The idea of a state initiated and centralized center to educate labour union members gained traction during the Third National Development Plan (1975 - 1980). This proposition came after the military government proscribed the two major union founded labour training centers: the pro-west Trade Union Institute for Economic and Social Development managed by the African-American Labour Center in partnership with Nigerian led United Labour Congress and the left leaning Lumumba Labour Institute. The democratic government of Shehu Shagari (1979 - 1983) built on the earlier initiatives and began planning for a training institute to be located at Ilorin in 1983. In 1986, a decree establishing the National Institute of Labour Studies was enacted, the new legislation placed made it a statutory center within the Federal Ministry of Employment, Labour and Productivity.  This decree was replaced in 1990 by Act Cap 261 and two years later to honor labour activist and leader of the 1945 general strike, Michael Imoudu, the institute's named was changed to Michael Imoudu National Institute for Labour Studies.

The main aims of the institute is to promote capacity building of workers and best practices and harmony in relationships between labour unions and management. This is achieved through research and collaboration with tertiary institutions within the country, consultancy, seminars, conferences,  lectures on labour union administration, provision of grants to scholars and publication of journals and working papers.

The institute has an annual summit attended by stakeholders of MINILS and labour matters.

To promote its mission of capacity building, certificate and diploma awarding courses were established at the institute,  in addition, focus on communications and information technology training has led to the construction of a dedicated center for ICT.

MINILS programmes are offered both on full and part-time basis that award Professional Certificate In Industrial And Labour Relations(PCILR), National Diplomas at main campus, its distant learning centres, as well as on e-learning platform.

See also

Federal Ministries of Nigeria
Nigerian Civil Service
 www.labour.gov.ng

References

External links 
 Official homepage

1939 establishments in the British Empire
Federal Ministries of Nigeria
Ministries established in 1939
Employer associations in Nigeria
Productivity organizations